Evangelicals and Catholics Together is a 1994 ecumenical document signed by leading Evangelical and Catholic scholars in the United States. The co-signers of the document were Charles Colson and Richard John Neuhaus, representing each side of the discussions. It was part of a larger ecumenical rapprochement in the United States that had begun in the 1970s with Catholic-Evangelical collaboration and in later para-church organizations such as Moral Majority founded by Jerry Falwell at the urging of Francis Schaeffer and his son Frank Schaeffer.

The statement is written as a testimony that spells out the need for Protestants and Catholics to deliver a common witness to the modern world at the eve of the third millennium. It draws heavily from the theology of the New Testament and the Trinitarian doctrine of the Nicene creed. It seeks to encourage what is known as spiritual ecumenism and day-to-day ecumenism.

Evangelical signatories
 Charles Colson, Prison Fellowship and Southern Baptist Convention affiliated 
 Richard Land, Christian Life Commission of the Southern Baptist Convention 
 J. I. Packer, a British-born Canadian Christian theologian in the low church Anglican and Reformed traditions.

Catholic signatories
 Fr. Avery Dulles, Society of Jesus and Fordham University 
 Bishop Francis George, Missionary Oblates of Mary Immaculate, Diocese of Yakima (Washington) 
 Mgsr. William Murphy, Chancellor of the Archdiocese of Boston
 Fr. Richard John Neuhaus, former Lutheran minister and Institute on Religion and Democracy 
 Archbishop Francis Stafford, Archdiocese of Denver
 George Weigel, Ethics and Public Policy Center

Endorsed by

Evangelical Protestants

 William J. Abraham, Perkins School of Theology
 Elizabeth Achtemeier Union Theological Seminary (Virginia)
 Bill Bright, Campus Crusade for Christ
 Bishop William Frey, Trinity Episcopal School for Ministry 
 Os Guinness, Trinity Forum
 Richard Mouw, Fuller Theological Seminary
 Mark Noll, Wheaton College 
 Thomas C. Oden, Drew University 
 J. I. Packer, Regent College (British Columbia) 
 Pat Robertson, Regent University and The 700 Club

Catholics

 William Bentley Ball, Harrisburg, Pennsylvania
Fr Augustine Di Noia, OP, Dominican House of Studies 
 Mary Ann Glendon, professor at Harvard Law School 
 Peter Kreeft, professor at Boston College 
 Michael Novak, Institute on Religion and Democracy and Resident Scholar of the American Enterprise Institute for Social Policy Research 
 Cardinal John O'Connor, Archdiocese of New York 
 Bishop Carlos A. Sevilla, SJ, Archdiocese of San Francisco

The agreement was reached a few years before the 1999 Joint Declaration on the Doctrine of Justification (between Lutherans and Catholics), which in substance says many of the same things as ECT in that it emphasizes Sola gratia over Sola fide.

Criticism
Many evangelicals, while appreciating the goal of social agreement in the ECT document, are still opposed to the theological wording of the document. Theologians such as John Ankerberg, D. James Kennedy, John F. MacArthur, and R. C. Sproul, have published concern about it being "a step in exactly the wrong direction" and "going too far" in claiming theological agreement. They emphasize that sola fide is a fundamental distinctive of evangelical theology, which fundamentally divides evangelicals and Catholics theologically, as Rome condemned sola fide at the Council of Trent and has never lifted that condemnation (anathema). Further they argue that it 'attacks the very foundation of absolute truth' by concessions to relativism and post-modernism, belying its profession of joint commitment to the Gospel, thus rendering that Gospel moot. They claim, 'It falls lock-step into line with our culture’s minimalist approach to truth issues'.

References

Bibliography
 .

Catholic–Protestant ecumenism
1994 documents